Leif Johansson (born 1952) is a former professional tennis player from Sweden.

In 1973, Johansson achieved a career-high ranking of World No. 51.

He is the father of Joachim Johansson, also a former male professional tennis player.

See also
List of Sweden Davis Cup team representatives

References

Swedish male tennis players
1952 births
Living people
People from Södertälje
Sportspeople from Stockholm County